Alvar Aalto (1898–1976) was a Finnish architect, and one of the key figures of modernist architecture during the twentieth century. In addition to architecture, his oeuvre includes furniture, textiles and glassware. A full annotated encyclopedia of his entire works was compiled by his biographer Göran Schildt, Alvar Aalto, A Life's work: Architecture, Design and Art (1994).

Works

Buildings

Notes

Writing and documented speeches

Notes

Footnotes

References
 
 
 
 
 
 
 
 
 

Aalto
Aalto, Alvar
 List
Alvar Aalto